Puducherry Pradesh Congress Committee (or Puducherry PCC) is the affiliate of the Indian National Congress in the union territory of Puducherry. It is headed by A. V. Subramanian.

List of Chief Ministers of Pondicherry and Puducherry from Indian National Congress

Following is the list of the Chief Ministers of Puducherry from Indian National Congress:

See also
 Congress Working Committee
 All India Congress Committee
 Pradesh Congress Committee

Notes

References

External links

Politics of Puducherry
Indian National Congress by state or union territory